Gore is a town in western Sequoyah County, Oklahoma, United States. It is part of the Fort Smith, Arkansas-Oklahoma Metropolitan Statistical Area. The population was 977 at the 2010 census, an increase of 15 percent over the figure of 850 recorded in 2000.

Gore claims to be the "trout capital of Oklahoma", with great fishing in Lake Tenkiller, the Illinois River, and the Arkansas River.

History
This community began as a small settlement in Indian Territory known as Campbell, named for Dr. W. W. Campbell, who, along with Joe Lynch, operated a ferry across the Arkansas River between Campbell and Webbers Falls.  Tahlonteskee, the capital of the Western Cherokee from 1828–1839, was near here, just two miles to the north of town.   In 1829, John Jolly, chief of the Cherokee Nation–West, built a home in this area.

The settlement was also known as Illinois Station or "Illinois Station, Campbell Post Office."  It became a stage stop on the route between Fort Gibson and Fort Smith. A post office designation of Campbell was assigned to Dr. Campbell's store in 1888. Also in 1888, the St. Louis, Iron Mountain and Southern Railway (later the Missouri Pacific Railway) built a rail line through the settlement.

By 1909, the town had a bank, two lumber companies, a flour mill, a cotton gin, two hotels, and numerous retail outlets. The town changed its name on October 22, 1909 in honor of Oklahoma Senator Thomas Gore, who was serving as one of Oklahoma's U. S. senators immediately after statehood. A fire destroyed most of the business district in 1909. Gore had a population of 319 by the 1910 U. S. census.

The town almost got a second rail line in 1917 when Congress approved construction by the Webbers Falls Railroad of a bridge over the Arkansas from Webbers Falls.  However, that railroad was instead scrapped in 1918.

The UF6 plant was bought by General Atomics in 1988, and closed in 1993.

Geography

Demographics

As of the census of 2000, there were 850 people, 368 households, and 257 families residing in the town. The racial makeup of the town was 68.59% White, 0.12% African American, 24.71% Native American, 0.12% from other races, and 6.47% from two or more races. Hispanic or Latino of any race were 0.82% of the population.

There were 368 households, out of which 28.5% had children under the age of 18 living with them, 56.0% were married couples living together, 12.0% had a female householder with no husband present, and 29.9% were non-families. 26.9% of all households were made up of individuals, and 12.0% had someone living alone who was 65 years of age or older. The average household size was 2.31 and the average family size was 2.78.

In the town, the population was spread out, with 23.9% under the age of 18, 8.8% from 18 to 24, 21.9% from 25 to 44, 26.9% from 45 to 64, and 18.5% who were 65 years of age or older. The median age was 42 years. For every 100 females, there were 89.3 males. For every 100 females age 18 and over, there were 81.7 males.

The median income for a household in the town was $27,266, and the median income for a family was $37,000. Males had a median income of $28,125 versus $27,188 for females. The per capita income for the town was $16,059. About 15.2% of families and 16.6% of the population were below the poverty line, including 18.2% of those under age 18 and 21.1% of those age 65 or over.

Notable people

 Professional basketball coach John Whisenant was born and raised in Gore.

 Actor Joshua Morrow of The Young and the Restless briefly attended school at Gore.

 Steven Tyler, the lead singer of Aerosmith, once used to frequent Gore while married to his second wife Teresa Barrick, who is originally from the area.

 Thomas Gore, for whom the town is named, is claimed to have been an atheist with a strong misanthropic streak - "a populist who didn't like people", as expressed by his grandson, author Gore Vidal.

 The Attorney General for the State of Maine, G. Steven Rowe, is from Gore.

 Gore is the birthplace of 1969 Heisman Trophy Winner, Steve Owens, who was raised in Miami, Oklahoma. There is a sports complex in Gore named after him.

Notes

References

External links
 Town website
 Encyclopedia of Oklahoma History and Culture - Gore

Towns in Sequoyah County, Oklahoma
Towns in Oklahoma
Fort Smith metropolitan area
Cherokee towns in Oklahoma
Oklahoma populated places on the Arkansas River